The Vasad–Kathana line belongs to  division of Western Railway zone in Gujarat State.

History

Vasad–Kathana branch line was opened in 1953. The length of Vasad–Kathana branch line was 43 km.

References

5 ft 6 in gauge railways in India
Railway lines in Gujarat